Leptostylus spermovoratis is a species of beetle in the family Cerambycidae. It was described by Chemsack in 1972.

References

Leptostylus
Beetles described in 1972